Nyctennomos is a genus of moths of the family Erebidae. The genus was erected by George Hampson in 1926. All species of this genus are known from Madagascar.

Species in this genus are:
Nyctennomos ambitsha Viette, 1976
Nyctennomos catalai (Viette, 1954)
Nyctennomos decaryi (Viette, 1954)
Nyctennomos descarpentriesi (Viette, 1954)
Nyctennomos peratosema Hampson, 1926
Nyctennomos subpurpurascens (Viette, 1954)
Nyctennomos ungulata Berio, 1956

References

Calpinae